The Test of Chinese as a Foreign Language (TOCFL) is the standardized test of Taiwanese Mandarin (a type of Mandarin Chinese) language proficiency of Taiwan for non-native speakers such as foreign students. It is administered by the Steering Committee for the Test Of Proficiency-Huayu (SC-TOP). The committee is under the direction of the Republic of China's Ministry of Education. The test was formerly known as the TOP or Test Of Proficiency-Huayu.

For children aged 7–12, an age-specific test exists called the Children's Chinese Competency Certification (or CCCC).

The test cannot be taken in Mainland China, Hong Kong or Macao, where only the PRC's HSK exam can be taken. Conversely, the HSK exam is not available in Taiwan.

History of SC-TOP
The Steering Committee for the Test Of Proficiency-Huayu (SC-TOP) was established in November 2005 under the direction of the Republic of China's Ministry of Education. Originally called the Chinese Language Testing Center and renamed in January 2007, the Committee aims to develop and promote an effective Chinese assessment system, mainly the Test of Chinese as a Foreign Language (TOCFL), for Chinese learners worldwide to assess their Chinese proficiency.

The SC-TOP has the following major missions:

 To design and plan the test contents of the TOCFL and CCCC exams
 To build test item pools for the TOCFL and CCCC exams
 To develop computer-based Chinese proficiency testing systems
 To promote Taiwan's Chinese proficiency tests for non-native speakers of Chinese
 To increase the exchange among Chinese proficiency testing organizations worldwide

History of TOCFL
The Test of Chinese as a Foreign Language (TOCFL) is a standardized language proficiency test developed for non-native speakers of Chinese. It is the result of a joint project of the Mandarin Training Center, the Graduate Institute of Teaching Chinese as a Second Language, and the Psychological Testing Center of National Taiwan Normal University. The research project started in August 2001, and the tests started to be conducted in 2003. So far, it has served test takers from over 60 countries. The new version of TOCFL is developed since 2008, to become available in 2013.

The new version of the TOCFL has four proficiency bands: Novice, Band A, Band B, and Band C. Each of the bands has two levels. Therefore, there are a total of eight levels: Novice 1 and 2, followed by Levels 1 to 6. The items on the test of each level are 50 multiple choice items, to be answered in 60 minutes. Test takers can choose the test levels best suited to them based on their Chinese language proficiency and learning background. The former version (until 2013) had only five levels.

Purpose and use

TOCFL test takers who reach the level requirements will receive a certificate, which can serve as a credential of proficiency in Chinese for:
 Applying to the Taiwan Scholarship.
 Applying to academic programs at colleges or universities in Taiwan, as a reference for the subject of Chinese.
 Providing a job-required proof of language competency.

Currently some undergraduate and graduate programs in Taiwan adopt the TOCFL certificate as the requirement for admission or as the evaluation of an applicant's Chinese proficiency. In addition, many international businesses in Taiwan, such as LG, adopt TOCFL as a reference for their employee dispatch programs. Several overseas companies also refer to candidates' TOCFL certificates when recruiting.

Examinants
The TOCFL is intended for non-native speakers of Mandarin. Those who wish to know their level of Mandarin Chinese proficiency, and those who want to study, work, or do business in Mandarin Chinese-speaking countries or contexts are welcome to register for the test. The following table sets out the suggested learning hours of Mandarin Chinese, and suggested vocabulary base at each test level.

Please note:

 The suggested number of course hours learning Mandarin Chinese required by overseas test-takers may need to be doubled. For example, the table indicates that Level 2 test-takers who take Mandarin Chinese courses in a Chinese-speaking country need to have completed 240–360 course hours. People taking courses in countries where other languages are spoken generally require 480–720 hours.
 The suggested vocabulary list for each level can be found online at the official site.

Relationship with TBCL
Taiwan Benchmarks for the Chinese Language (臺灣華語文能力基準, TBCL) is a guideline developed by Taiwan's National Academy for Educational Research to describe seven levels of Chinese language proficiency. It includes lists which contains 3,100 Chinese characters, 14,425 words, and 496 grammar points.

For exams starting from August 2021, the TBCL ability level column will be added to the transcripts to help Chinese learners around the world understand the correspondence between TBCL, CEFR, and ACTFL guidelines. The TOCFL will also use the TBCL as one of the references for test design.

Comparison with HSK
It is difficult to directly compare the Hanyu Shuiping Kaoshi (HSK) with the TOCFL.

Unlike TOCFL, HSK has 6 levels. The six HSK levels and the six Band A, B and C TOCFL levels all claim that these levels are compatible with the six levels of the Common European Framework of Reference for Languages (CEFR). However, for each test, the number of words or characters required differs. For example, TOCFL generally requires more vocabulary at each level, comparing with the HSK.

The German, Italian and French associations of Chinese language teachers argue that HSK level 6 (2010 version) is equivalent to CEFR level B1/B2/C1 (about TOCFL Level 4) and reject Hanban's claim. 

The new Chinese Proficiency Standard, effective on July 1st 2021, adds 300 required characters to every level, therefore the amount of words that must be studied increases exponentially. According to the new Chinese Proficiency Standard, levels 1, 2, 3, 4 in the coming HSK would be more difficult than its 2010 version, and less so in levels 5 and 6. The more difficult levels (7-9) would equivalent to CEFR level C.

Format
TOCFL tests four language skills: Listening, Reading, Speaking, and Writing.

Listening
Novice has three sections. There are 25 multiple-choice questions in total. This test takes approximately 25 minutes.

Band A has four sections: Picture Description, Single-round Dialogue (questions with picture options), Multiple-round Dialogue (questions with picture options), and Dialogue (questions with text options). There are 50 multiple-choice questions in total. This test takes approximately 60 minutes.

Band B and Band C have two sections: Dialogue and Monologue. There are 50 multiple-choice questions with text options. This test takes approximately 60 minutes.

Reading
Novice has two sections. There are 25 multiple-choice questions in total. This test takes 25 minutes.

Band A has five sections: Sentence Comprehension, Picture Description, Gap Filling, Paragraph Completion, and Reading Comprehension. There are 45 multiple-choice questions and 5 matching questions. This test takes 60 minutes.

Bands B and C have two sections: Gap Filling and Reading Comprehension. Each test consists of 50 multiple-choice questions and takes 60 minutes.

Speaking
The TOCFL Speaking test adopts a holistic scoring approach, taking into account the content, fluency, and language skills of the test taker. The results are presented in the form of scale scores. The objective is mainly to assess the competence of the test takers to effectively accomplish the communication tasks verbally in different language contexts.

Writing
The TOCFL Writing test is an evaluation of the test-taker's ability to use written materials to effectively transmit information in particular contexts. The level-based grading system is based on the appropriateness and substance of the test-taker's responses to situational tasks, compositional structure and completeness, correct syntax, and the use of a suitably wide range of appropriate vocabulary.

Overseas testing
Aside from being available in Taiwan, SC-TOP has been providing overseas testing services since 2006. However, compared to the HSK exam, the number of test locations is somewhat limited. According to the SC-TOP's official website, the test can be taken in the following 21 countries:
 Asian Pacific — Australia, India, Indonesia, Japan, Korea, Malaysia, New Zealand, Thailand, Vietnam
 Central and South America — Nicaragua, Paraguay
 Europe — Austria, Belgium, France, Germany, Poland, Russia, Sweden, Switzerland, United Kingdom
 North America — Canada, United States, México

Out of these states, Paraguay recognizes the Republic of China as the sole legitimate government of China.

See also 
 Hanyu Shuiping Kaoshi (HSK) – the Chinese language test used in Mainland China
ZHC – a Chinese language test intended for native speakers in Mainland China
Test of English as a Foreign Language
List of language proficiency tests

References

External links
 Steering Committee for the Test Of Proficiency-Huayu
 The Test of Chinese as a Foreign Language (TOCFL)

Standard Chinese
Chinese language tests
Language tests